Bernadotte is an unincorporated community in Bernadotte Township, Nicollet County, Minnesota, United States, near Lafayette.  The community is located near the junction of Nicollet County Roads 1 and 10.

Bernadotte is the home of Historic Marker: Bernadotte Lutheran Church and Historic Marker: Bernadotte Co-op Creamery.

Bernadotte is also the home of the world's largest collection of cow-related items, amassed by local celebrity and resident Ruth Klossner. This record was officially approved by Guinness World Records on June 9, 2015.

History
A post office called Bernadotte was established in 1871, and remained in operation until 1904. The community was named for Jean Baptiste Jules Bernadotte, a French Jacobines leader, later French Marshal, later King Charles XIV of Sweden and founder of the House of Bernadotte.

References

Unincorporated communities in Nicollet County, Minnesota
Unincorporated communities in Minnesota